Col du Grand Colombier (el. ) is a mountain pass in the Jura mountains in France.

This pass lies at the southern extremity of the Jura in the massif of the Grand Colombier. With the Col du Chasseral, it is the highest road pass in the Jura. It passes between the Grand Colombier (el. ) and the Croix du Colombier, which is accessible by trail from the pass.

The view from the summit is superb, either down the valley of the Rhône, the Lac du Bourget and the gorges of Val-de-Fier, or the distant peaks of the Alps.

Cycle racing
It is one of the most difficult passes in France, with stretches in excess of 20% on the climb from Artemare via Virieu-le-Petit on the Bugey (western) side.  The pass has seen frequent use in cycling, being a regular feature of the Tour de l'Ain and also used in the Critérium du Dauphiné and Tour de l'Avenir.

This climb is the direction used on Stage 5 of the 2012 Critérium du Dauphiné and Stage 10 of the 2012 Tour de France.

Tour de France 
It was visited by the Tour de France for the first time on Stage 10 of the 2012 Tour as a Hors Catégorie climb. The leader over the summit was Thomas Voeckler, who went on to take the stage victory in Bellegarde-sur-Valserine. Stage 15 of the 2020 Tour finished atop the pass.

References

External links

 Le col du Grand Colombier dans le Tour de France  
 Details for each of the four climbs 
 Tour de France Stage 10 video preview

Mountain passes of Auvergne-Rhône-Alpes
Mountain passes of the Jura
Landforms of Ain